The Betwa (Hindi: बेतवा, Sanskrit: वेत्रवती) is a river in Central and Northern India, and a tributary of the Yamuna. It rises in the Vindhya Range (Raisen) just north of Narmadapuram in Madhya Pradesh and flows northeast through Madhya Pradesh and Orchha to Uttar Pradesh. Nearly half of its course, which is not navigable, runs over the Malwa Plateau. The confluence of the Betwa and the Yamuna rivers is in Hamirpur district in Uttar Pradesh.

The Indian navy named one of its frigates INS Betwa in honour of the river.

History 

In Sanskrit "Betwa" is Vetravati. This river is mentioned in the epic Mahabharata along with the Charmanwati river. Both are tributaries of Yamuna. Vetravati was also known as Shuktimati. The capital of Chedi Kingdom was on the banks of this river. In accordance with an inter-state agreement between the states of Uttar Pradesh and Madhya Pradesh in 1973, Betwa River Board (BRB) was constituted under the Betwa River Board Act, 1976. The Union Minister of Ministry of Water Resources, the Chairman of the Board, the Union Minister of Power, Union Minister of State for Water Resources, and Chief Ministers and Ministers in-charge of Finance, Irrigation and Power of Uttar Pradesh and Madhya Pradesh are its members.

Future 
The Betwa River is being linked with the Ken River as a part of the river linking project in Madhya Pradesh. Latterly the National Board for Wildlife (NBWL) has given its clearance for the Ken-Betwa inter-linking of rivers (ILR) project. Another noteworthy project on the Betwa River is the construction of the Matatila Dam, an undertaking between the states of Madhya Pradesh and Uttar Pradesh. The region is important for migratory waterbirds. An ambitious project to link Ken and Betwa rivers has become a stage for a unique man-animal conflict.

Dams 
 Rajghat Dam
 Matatila Dam
 Parichha Dam
 Dhurwara Dam
 Halali Dam

See also
 Ganga
 Yamuna

References

External links

 Betwa River
 Ken-Betwa river link project to cost Rs 4,500 cr Business Line
 

 
Rivers in Buddhism
Rivers of India
Rivers of Madhya Pradesh
Rivers of Uttar Pradesh
Tributaries of the Yamuna River